Gerhard is the professional name of a Canadian artist known for the elaborately detailed background illustrations in the comics series Cerebus the Aardvark.

Biography
Gerhard was born on April 14, 1959, in Edmonton. His association with Dave Sim's Cerebus began with issue #65 (August 1984), and continued through its conclusion in issue #300, in March, 2004. The series was written by Dave Sim, who also drew the foreground figures, and had worked on the self-published series largely solo for the first 64 issues. Gerhard jokingly described his job saying that he "draws tables and chairs behind an aardvark". He is also fond of photography, later issues of the comic book have covers based on his scenic photos, and sailing.

Three years after finishing his work on Cerebus, Gerhard ended his professional and personal relationship with Dave Sim. Subsequently, Sim has been in the process of purchasing Gerhard's share of Aardvark-Vanaheim.

Although most associated with Cerebus, Gerhard has produced works for other publications, although mostly with Sim. In September 1994, however, he worked with Stephen R. Bissette on the cover to Bissette's Tyrant #1, and coloured Sim's back cover for Oni Press' Free Speeches #1 (August 1998).

References

External links

Art of Gerhard, a gallery of both Cerebus and non-Cerebus related artwork by Gerhard
Gerhard's work on Cerebus at the Grand Comics Database

1959 births
Living people
Artists from Edmonton
Canadian comics artists